Eliza Jane Morley ( Taylor-Cotter; born 24 October 1989), known professionally as Eliza Taylor, is an Australian actress. She is best known for her roles as Janae Timmins on the Australian soap opera Neighbours (2005–08) and as Clarke Griffin on the dystopian science fiction series The 100 (2014–2020).

Early life
Taylor was born in Melbourne and has three siblings: two sisters and one brother. Her mother is an author and a graphic designer, and her stepfather was a stand-up comedian, while her biological father used to own cafés around Melbourne. She wanted to be a marine biologist growing up.

Career

2003–2013: Career beginnings and Neighbours
After a lead role in Pirate Islands, Taylor starred as Rosie Cartwright in The Sleepover Club in 2003. She transitioned to mature audience programs with a guest role on Blue Heelers in 2003.

Taylor got her big breakthrough in the Australian soap opera Neighbours in 2005. She secured the role of Janae Timmins after previously appearing in a guest role in 2003. Taylor had originally auditioned for the role of Lana Crawford, however, actress Bridget Neval was eventually cast. In 2007, Nell Feeney and Sianoa Smit-McPhee, who play Taylor's on-screen mother Janelle Timmins and sister Bree Timmins, were written out by executive producer Ric Pellizzeri, but it was confirmed that they wanted Taylor to remain in the serial as Janae. Later that year, Taylor decided to quit the serial to pursue other projects such as pantomime and a further career in the US. One of her reasons was that all of her on-screen family had been written out and new cast members gave the serial the feel of a different place, adding: "It just didn't feel like the family that I joined when I started three years ago". Taylor finished filming her final studio scenes in 2007 and her final episode was screened on 8 February 2008. In 2007, she was nominated for Best Female at the Inside Soap Awards. 

Taylor travelled to the UK in late November 2007, and on 1 December 2007 she turned on the Weymouth Christmas lights. She portrayed Snow White in a Christmas pantomime of Snow White from 19 December 2007 to 6 January 2018 in Weymouth Pavilion, England.  In 2009, she was in an episode of All Saints and filmed a short drama-comedy movie called The Laundromat. Taylor also filmed a role in the horror movie 6 Plots. She later filmed the pilot of Winners & Losers.

2014–present: The 100

On 1 March 2013, it was announced that Taylor had been cast as lead character Clarke Griffin in the new post-apocalyptic science fiction drama series The 100 on The CW. The series premiered on Wednesday, 19 March 2014 at 9:00 p.m. Explaining how she got the part in the series, Taylor said:
I didn't actually audition. I'd been living in LA for about a month and my credit card was stolen and all my money was taken – spent at Home Depot, which was great – and I was ready to pack my bags and go back to Australia because I didn't know how I was going to survive in LA any longer and then I got a call from my manager to say that an audition I'd done months ago for a film had been looked at by the producers of this TV show called The 100 and they wanted me to go in for a reading the next day. So I read the script that night and loved it and went in for the meeting the next day and got the role. Before I knew it I was on a plane to Vancouver to shoot the pilot and my whole life changed.

For her role in The 100, Taylor was nominated for Choice TV Actress: Sci-Fi/Fantasy at the Teen Choice Awards from 2015 to 2018.

In 2017, she starred as Ellen Langford in the Netflix Christmas romantic comedy-drama film Christmas Inheritance. In 2021, it was announced Taylor would be executive producing and acting in the indie film It Only Takes A Night. In 2022, she was set to star in sci-fi film I’ll Be Watching directed by Erik Bernard.

Personal life 
On 7 June 2019, Taylor announced on Twitter that she had married Bob Morley, her co-star on The 100. Taylor and Morley were originally set to direct episodes for the seventh and final season of The 100. However, Taylor was unable to direct her episode due to suffering from a miscarriage. In March 2022, they announced the birth of their first child, a son.

Filmography

Film

Television

Awards and nominations

References

External links

 
 

1989 births
Living people
Australian soap opera actresses
Australian child actresses
Actresses from Melbourne
21st-century Australian actresses